Pranpir Badshah's tomb is a 14th-century tomb, built from white material, near Mahabir Stadium in Hisar city of Haryana state in India.

Location
The tomb is located next to the Panchayat bhawan, within the compound of Government college Hisar, next to Mahabir Stadium.

History
This is the tomb of Baba Pranpir Badshah, the spiritual teacher of Sher Bahlol or Dana Sher. Sher Bahlol was also a spiritual teacher who foretold that Ghiyas-ud-din-Tughluq (c. 1320–25 CE) would become the king of Delhi sultanate.

Architecture
Tomb is built on a raised platform, it built using dressed white kankar stones blocks to a certain height, top of the tomb is built using lakhauri bricks, all four sides  have arched gates. The dome on top sits on an octagonal drum, there is no evidence of any grave inside.

Restoration
The tomb is in dilapidated condition, some minor repair work has been taken by Archaeological Survey of India.

See also

 Sheikhpura Kothi at Hansi
 Humayun's Tomb at Delhi
 Ibrahim Lodhi's Tomb at Panipat
 Bu Ali Shah Qalandar at Panipat
 Sheikh Chilli's Tomb at Kurukshetra
 Shah Zia Ud Din Muhammed's tomb at Naraingarh Ambala
 Sheikh Musa's tomb at Nuh
 Shah Nazm al Haq's tomb at Sohna
 Aga Khan Historic Cities Support Programme

References

External links
 /Pranpir+Badshah+hisar+wikimapia/@29.1477134,75.6465181,12z/data=!3m1!4b1!4m8!4m7!1m0!1m5!1m1!1s0x3912332cfef70175:0xff5b7f27ab9878fa!2m2!1d75.7165584!2d29.1477316 Google location map of Pranpir Badshah's tomb
 18-image  online picture gallery of Pranpir Badshah tomb Hisar taken by American Institute of Indian Studies in 2008 CE
 Online picture gallery of Indo-Islamic monuments of Haryana taken by American Institute of Indian Studies in 2008 CE
 Field study and documentation by American Institute of Indian Studies in Jan–Feb 2010.

Islamic architecture
Sandstone buildings in India
Tourist attractions in Haryana
Tombs in India